Romain Reynaud (born 2 March 1983) is a French former professional footballer who played as a defender. He is the head coach of Championnat National 3 club Hauts Lyonnais.

During the 2009–10 season, Reynaud played in Ligue 2 for AC Arles-Avignon. He joined Châteauroux the following season, remaining with the club until 2012.

References

External links
 
 

1983 births
Living people
Footballers from Saint-Étienne
Association football defenders
French footballers
Ligue 2 players
Championnat National 2 players
FC Libourne players
AC Arlésien players
Vannes OC players
Moulins Yzeure Foot players
LB Châteauroux players
K.V. Kortrijk players
Oud-Heverlee Leuven players
Andrézieux-Bouthéon FC players
Belgian Pro League players
Challenger Pro League players
Expatriate footballers in Belgium
French expatriate footballers
French football managers
Hauts Lyonnais managers
Championnat National 3 managers